Daria Sergeevna Panenkova (born 8 December 2002) is a retired Russian figure skater. She is the 2017 JGP Latvia champion.

Personal life 
Panenkova was born on 8 December 2002 in Moscow.

Career

Early career 
Panenkova began learning to skate in 2006. Her first coach was Natalia Gavrilova. Eteri Tutberidze and Sergei Dudakov became her coaches in 2016.

Panenkova finished fifth at the 2017 Russian Junior Championships after placing seventh in the short program and fifth in the free skate. Making her international debut, she won the junior gold medal at the Sofia Trophy in early February 2017.

2017–2018 season 
Panenkova's ISU Junior Grand Prix (JGP) debut came in early September 2017 in Riga, Latvia; ranked first in the short program and second in the free skate, she won the gold medal ahead of Rika Kihira. After taking silver at her second JGP assignment, she qualified to the JGP Final in Nagoya, Japan, where she placed fifth. Two weeks later, she placed eighth at the senior Russian Nationals after placing seventh in both segments of the competition, with a combined score of over 200 points.

In January 2018 she competed at the 2018 Russian Junior Championships where she placed fifth after placing seventh in the short program and fifth in the free skate.

2018–2019 season 
During the summer of 2018, Panenkova announced that she'd parted ways with coach Eteri Tutberidze and her team at Sambo 70 for unclear reasons. She joined the camp of Anna Tsareva.

Panenkova made her senior international debut in late October at the 2018 Skate Canada in Laval, Quebec. She placed last in the short program after a messy skate that included a popped triple flip, but came back in the free skate to score 117.13 points, the sixth highest free skate in the ladies event. She finished ninth overall. A week later she placed sixth at the 2018 Grand Prix of Helsinki. In late November she finished fifth at the 2018 CS Tallinn Trophy.

At the 2019 Russian Championships she placed eighteenth.

Retirement 
Panekova retired on September 2, 2020 to pursue a coaching career in figure skating.

Programs

Competitive highlights 
GP: Grand Prix; CS: Challenger Series; JGP: Junior Grand Prix

Detailed results

Senior level

Junior level

References

External links 
 

2002 births
Russian female single skaters
Living people
Figure skaters from Moscow